The Shetou Doushan Temple is an ancestral temple in Shetou Township, Changhua County, Taiwan.

History
The temple underwent renovation in 1971 in which the verandas at the two sides were changed to a flat-top format.

Architecture
The temple consists of two-wing building and a courtyard. The building consists of front hall and shrine.

Transportation
The temple is accessible southeast from Shetou Station of Taiwan Railways.

See also

 Chinese ancestral veneration
 Fangqiaotou Tianmen Temple
 List of temples in Taiwan
 List of tourist attractions in Taiwan

References

Temples in Changhua County
Taoist temples in Taiwan
1880 establishments in Taiwan
Religious buildings and structures completed in 1880